Wang Chengbin, may refer to:

 Wang Chengbin (born 1874), an ethnic Manchu Chinese general of the Warlord Era of the Republic of China.

 Wang Chengbin (born 1928), a lieutenant general (zhongjiang) of the People's Liberation Army (PLA).